The Wuchang bream (Megalobrama amblycephala) is a species of cyprinid fish native to bodies of water throughout the Yangtze basin, China, including Liangzi Lake.  It is an important object of  fish farming, and in 2012 its total production ranked 12th on the world list of most important fish species in aquaculture, with a total weight of 0.71 million tons and value of 1.16 billion US dollars.

References

Megalobrama
Endemic fauna of China
Freshwater fish of China
Fish described in 1955